Donnie Shaquan Lewis, (born June 2, 1974) also known as  Skillz, or  Mad Skillz is an American rapper known for his acclaimed 1996 album From Where???, a reference to his origins in Virginia, not  a New York City or Los Angeles rapper. He is also known for his yearly "Rap Ups," which he has done annually since 2002 (except in 2013).

Skillz is also the creator of the web series "Hip Hop Confessions", a series of shows that gathers hip hop purists and hip hop lovers alike where they reveal something hip hop related that they have never told anyone. The show has featured Q-Tip, Peanut Butter Wolf, Kwamé and DJ Jazzy Jeff.

Early life
Lewis was born June 2, 1974, in Detroit, Michigan and after spending his early childhood in Fayetteville, North Carolina, he then moved to Richmond, Virginia, at a young age. He credits Run DMC for getting him involved in hip hop as a child.

Career
He first made a name for himself by finishing in second place (Losing to MC Supernatural) in a national freestyle competition, which eventually resulted in a recording contract with Atlantic Records.  At this time he went by the stage name Mad Skillz rather than just Skillz. Mad Skillz' Atlantic debut album, From Where???, and its single, "The Nod Factor", were released in 1996, but neither received much commercial or critical attention.  The album's title was a reference to the regionalism in hip-hop, and at the time the state of Virginia did not have a large hip-hop scene. In the late-1990s more of a Virginia scene emerged, and he allied himself with fellow Virginia natives Missy Elliott, Timbaland and the Neptunes. He made appearances on Timbaland's albums Tim's Bio in 1998, and Indecent Proposal in 2001; Timbaland made plans to sign Skillz to the Blackhand label he was developing; however, this label failed to materialize. He along with Danja Mowf, Lonnie B and Kalonji The Immortal, members of Skillz' Supafriendz collective, also appeared on a remix of Aaliyah's hit single "Are You That Somebody" in 1998.

In 2000 Skillz was known for his single "Ghostwriter". The lyrics say he has written hit singles for others.

Skillz eventually got a deal with Rawkus, where he recorded his 2002 LP I Ain't Mad No More, the title of which commemorated the official change of his MC moniker from "Mad Skillz" to just "Skillz." The aforementioned LP was never officially released in the U.S., however, during the Sprite Liquid Mix Tour in 2003 he sold some bootleg versions of this CD. The CD was re-packaged without several tracks as "Confessions Of A Ghostwriter" in 2005. A Supafriends LP, Supavision and another solo LP.

The Scritti Politti CD single for "Boom Boom Bap" features a track written as a collaboration between Skillz and Scritti frontman Green Gartside titled "Hands Up" and credited to Skillz'n'Green. The single was released in the UK in 2006.

Skillz released an album on December 30, 2014: Made In Virginia, produced by Bink Dog. Skillz is the founder of the supergroup, Supafriendz V.A. Playaz, with Timbaland, Magoo, N.E.R.D., Fam-Lay and Clipse.  He has recently gone back to his original moniker Mad Skillz and has returned to producing and deejaying.

In 2018 and 2020 Skillz was an artist-in-residence at the University of Richmond where he taught The Voice of Hip Hop in America.  On February 13, 2019, Mayor Levar Stoney declared it to be "Mad Skillz Day" in Richmond, VA to commemorate the 23rd anniversary of Skillz's debut album From Where??? and to recognize his "positive influence on our city." On January 14, 2020, he began his second semester as an artist-in residence at the University of Richmond.

Discography

Albums
 1996: From Where???
 2002: I Ain't Mad No More
 2005: Confessions of a Ghostwriter
 2008: The Million Dollar Backpack
 2010: The World Needs More Skillz
 2012: Thoughts Become Things
 2014: Made in Virginia (with Bink!)
2018: Im The DJ..and The Rapper

Compilations/Mixtapes
 2002: The Neptunes Collection Vol. 1
 2004: The James Brown Collection
 2006: Got Skillz? - The Timbaland Collection
 2009: Design of A Decade ( J. Period & Don Cannon)
 2011: Infamous Quotes Mixtape

Singles

As lead artist

As featured artist

References

External links
 Official Website *
 
 XXL Magazine Interview
 The Smoking Section Interviews Skillz
 Skillz - The Million Dollar Backpack Leaks
 Skillz Interview (ArtofRhyme.com)
 Skillz Interview on HHLO.net (Hip Hop Lives Online)

Living people
African-American male rappers
African-American record producers
American hip hop record producers
Atlantic Records artists
Big Beat Records (American record label) artists
Musicians from Richmond, Virginia
Rappers from Detroit
Rappers from Virginia
Swing Mob artists
MNRK Music Group artists
1974 births
Record producers from Virginia
Record producers from Michigan
Underground rappers
21st-century African-American people
20th-century African-American people